Photograph is a 2019 Indian romantic drama film written, co-produced and directed by Ritesh Batra. It stars Nawazuddin Siddiqui and Sanya Malhotra in the lead roles. The film follows a street photographer Rafi (Siddiqui), who tries to convince Miloni (Malhotra) to pose as his fiancee so that his grandmother stops pressuring him to get married.

The film had its world premiere at the 2019 Sundance Film Festival and the European premiere at the 69th Berlin International Film Festival. It was scheduled to release in India on 8 March 2019 but the date was pushed back and it released on 15 March 2019 to generally positive reviews from critics. It is scheduled for release in several countries including United Kingdom, United States, Spain, France and Australia later in summer.

Plot
The plot revolves around a struggling street photographer Rafi (Nawazuddin Siddiqui), based in Mumbai, who works day and night to pay off an old family debt. His grandmother (Farrukh Jaffar) wishes to see him married and constantly pressures him to find a suitable match. He convinces his grandmother by showing her a picture of a shy stranger, Miloni (Sanya Malhotra). When Rafi’s grandmother further prods to introduce her to his fiancé, he tracks down Miloni, a student belonging to a middle-class family. Rafi convinces her to fake their relationship, to which Miloni readily agrees. Despite the difference in their ages, culture, status and economic background, the two form a unique bond. The film is a love letter to Mumbai, bringing the city out as a character sheltering the two protagonists and their extraordinary journey.

Cast
 Nawazuddin Siddiqui as Rafiullah / 'Rafi'
 Sanya Malhotra as Miloni Shah
 Farrukh Jaffar as Rafi's dadi
 Ramesh Deo as doctor
 Deepak Chauhan
 Sunil Shakya
 Geetanjali Kulkarni
 Sachin Khedekar
 Vijay Raaz as Tiwari's ghost
 Jim Sarbh as Miloni's teacher
 Brinda Trivedi Nayak
 Denzil Smith
 Virendra Saxena 
 Akash Sinha
 Saharsh Kumar Shukla as Zakir Bhai
 Shree Dhar Dubey
 Amarjeet Singh
 Lubna Salim

Filming
Photograph was filmed on several locations in Mumbai. The shooting was finished in November 2017. It will be distributed and released in USA by Amazon Studios.

Marketing and release

The film was selected in Berlinale Special section of 69th Berlin International Film Festival. The film was screened on 14 February 2019 for its European premiere at the festival. Photograph is slated to be released in India on 15 March 2019 as per new official poster unveiled on 14 February 2019. Amazon Studios are releasing the film on 17 May 2019 in United States.

Home video
The film was made available as VOD on Amazon Prime Video in May 2019.

Reception

Critical response

The website's critics consensus reads, "Photograph enriches the familiar arc of its love story by refreshingly refracting its characters' budding bond through a sociocultural prism." Anupama Chopra of Film Companion gives three stars out of five and finds the film tender, meditative and poetic. She says, "The film is so quiet and so still in some parts, that you will get impatient. But it is evocative and its tenderness will stay with you." Guy Lodge of Variety said that the film "has the same quiet streak of wistful sentimentality that made The Lunchbox so globally beloved — and, for that matter, the same softly-softly humanity found in his two subsequent English-language efforts." Caryn James of The Hollywood Reporter called it a "nuanced, slow-burn, will-they-or-won't-they romance" and noted that Batra "turns a story that sounds tired and goofy into a lovely film with a tone of tender sadness."

Fionnuala Halligan of Screen International noted that the film's "deliberate pace does bring some rich rewards for the patient viewer, while a lovely ending feels like a throwback to the old-fashioned big screen romances of yore." Rahul Desai of Film Companion praised Malhotra's performance and wrote: "The reason Photograph really works, despite an airy premise, is the character of Miloni, and especially Sanya Malhotra’s evolved performance." Prahlad Srihari of Firstpost felt that the film "fails to replicate The Lunchboxs magic and called it a "slow-paced dramedy that can't quite transcend its clever setup."

Awards and nominations

References

External links
 
 

Films shot in Mumbai
Films set in Mumbai
Films about photographers
Indian romantic drama films
2019 romantic drama films